Stacy Landis, better known by his stage name Skatterman (pronounced Scātterman), is an American rapper from Kansas City, Missouri.

Biography
Starting as a teen, the syllable spitter knocked out hits with different groups, starting with Southside Rollers in 1999. In high school, Skatterman met rapper Snug Brim, and the two became longtime collaborators. When their 2001 album “Worth a Million” caught the attention of Tech N9ne and his label Strange Music, the duo signed on with Strange for a successful, seven-year run.

In 2009, differences in direction of the marketing and promotion of 
the project and the group however, would lead to a mutual parting of 
ways and Skatterman & Snug Brim would leave the label. They would go
on to release the Mixtape “This is Kansas City” to rave reviews.

In 2010 the group disbanded and in 2011 Skatterman released his first official 
mixtape/album for as a solo artist on his new imprint 
"BiggShot Music and Films",. He looked to develop a new sound and forge a
new direction from a now solitary and more personal point of view. With
the inaugural Mixtape “The Cook Book: Recipe 1 in 2011” and the 
subsequent release in January 2012 of "The Cook Book; Recipe 2", the 
industry veteran, broke new barriers and provided fans with a little 
more insight into life away from his previous label base.

Skatterman is featured on 15 songs spread over 13 Strange Music 
albums including the favorite "Riot Maker" from Tech N9ne's Killer 
Album. These albums have sold over 3 million copies collectively with 
some sales numbers skewed lower due to physical sales on tour dates. 
Skatterman and Snug Brim also have the song "Murder By #s" on the 
critically acclaimed B.E.E.F. Movie Soundtrack.

Though the sounds are evolving, Skatterman is still the same person he's always been. Skatterman says. "I have a lot of trust issues -- I don't trust anybody. I'm antisocial, so when I have a show, I arrive solo. I have been an artist on a label and I have been a part of a group. This is finally my opportunity to do ME."

In 2018, Skatterman released the track No Time Outs, featuring Snug Brim, after the two had parted ways, hinting they might be making more music together in the future.

Skatterman and Snug Brim
Skatterman & Snug Brim is a rap duo from Kansas City, Missouri, best known for their song, Block Party.

After releasing projects separately, Skatterman (born Stacy Dewayne Landis[1]) and Snug Brim (born Aaron R. Henderson[1]) combined as a group. The duo released their first album, Worth A Million, in 2002 through Below Radar Records. On the cover they were listed as "Skatterman & Snug Brim," but the inside of the case displayed "Skatterman & Snug Brim AKA Yung Gunz." The "Yung Gunz" name was later dropped due to a conflict with another group of the same name, but different spelling. (Young Gunz)

Strange Music

Travis, an established businessman in the world of furniture, was looking to get into the music industry. He had been a fan of Tech N9ne's and had seen how his career was being handled.

Tech at the time had several commitments and deals pulling him in several directions. He was currently signed to Qwest Records as well as MidwestSide Records, he also had commitments with both QDIII's Soundlab and Sway & King Tech of The Wake Up Show. Travis came into the picture and offered Tech something he never had, his own label. They agreed upon a 50/50 set up, Travis acting as president and Tech as vice president.

Their first venture was a deal with JCOR Entertainment to release Anghellic, though JCOR mishandled the album. They would then seek another 50/50 deal, this time with Mark Cerami (previously of Priority Records) & Dave Weiner (previously of JCOR Entertainment) who were doing their own joint label at the time, MSC Entertainment. The first album Absolute Power was a success, selling about 250,000 copies.

The label is now independent, no longer joined with MSC Entertainment, instead having a distribution deal through Fontana Distribution. Their first release under the deal with Fontana was Tech N9ne's 2006 effort, Everready (The Religion). While many albums were advertised for 2007 releases in the artwork for that album, only one release was seen in 2007 from Strange Music, Misery Loves Kompany.

In 2002, Skatterman and Snug Brim was the first group to officially sign with Strange Music. They recorded the album, Urban Legendz which was released in 2004. The single from the album, "Block Party," charted #24 on Billboards Hot R&B/Hip-Hop Singles Sales in October of the same year.

Word on tha Streets was released August 12, 2008. The follow up to their Urban Legendz album featured the songs: "I'm That Nigga", "Sukka Dukkas" and "Heartbreaker." Featured artists included Tech N9ne, Young Buck, Paul Wall and Rich The Factor.

On February 9, 2009, it was announced on Tech N9ne's official website that Skatterman & Snug Brim had decided to leave the Strange Music label after fulfilling their two-album commitment.

Bigg Shot Music & Films

After leaving Strange Music in early 2009, The duo revealed that they had started a new Independent Record Label, Bigg Shot Music & Films.

Plans for a new Skatterman & Snug Brim album were also included in this release, indicating that their third album Perseverance would be released through the label on September 1 via a two-album distribution deal with RYKO/Warner Bros. However, plans for the album were later dropped due to Snug Brim's decision to go back to school and work towards a 15-month certification in music marketing.

With  "BIGGSHOT Music & Films", Skatterman released the inaugural Mixtape “This is Kansas City; Vol. 1(2010)”. Skatterman also moved forward and released The Cookbook; Recipe One,.  and also the highly anticipated follow-up, "The Cook Book:Recipe Two" (2012), the industry veteran, breaks new barriers and provides fans with a little more insight into life away from his previous label base.

Discography

Studio albums

Solo releases

Skatterman
1998: Southside Rollers
2009: The Cook Book: Recipe 1
2012: The Cook Book: Recipe Two

Music videos
 2006: Tech N9ne - "Bout Ta Bubble"
 2007: Snug Brim - Get It (Directed by Kirk "KoBayne")[7]
 2008: Skatterman & Snug Brim - Ups And Downs (Directed by "The Ebonie Jeneus")[8]
 2011: DVD featuring Skatterman - This is Easy (Directed by Dawon Hughes)
 2011: Skatterman - Grown Man Bizness (Directed by: ATP & CutzIBN2 - Edited by: www.SMASHONUPRODUCTIONS.com)
 2012: Skatterman - Get Tha DJ Drunk (Directed by Kirk "KoBayne")[9]
 2012: Skatterman - Rise II Power (Directed by CutzIBN2 & ATP - Edited by CutzIBN2)
 2014: Skatterman - Im Back (Directed by CutzIBN2 & ATP - Edited by CutzIBN2)

Features
 2002: Tech N9ne - "Gunz Will Bust" (featuring Money Hungry, Skatterman & Snug Brim)
 2004: Kutt Calhoun - "In My Face" (featuring BG Bulletwound, Skatterman & Snug Brim)
 2006: Tech N9ne - "Riot Maker" (featuring Skatterman & Snug Brim)
 2007: Tech N9ne - "That Box" (featuring Greed, Krizz Kaliko, Kutt Calhoun, Skatterman & Snug Brim)
 2008: Krizz Kaliko - "Crew Cut" (featuring BG Bulletwound, Kutt Calhoun, Makzilla, Skatterman & Snug Brim & Tech N9ne)
 2008: Grave Plott - "In The Streets" (featuring BG Bulletwound, Kutt Calhoun & Skatterman & Snug Brim)
 2008: Grave Plott - "Midwest" (featuring Skatterman & Snug Brim)
 2008: Tech N9ne - "Seven Words" (featuring Krizz Kaliko & 'Skatterman')
 2008: Kutt Calhoun - "Running Away (The Breakup)" (featuring Bishop, Skatterman)
 2009: Krizz Kaliko - "Getcha Life Right" (featuring Skatterman & Snug Brim)
 2009: Big Scoob - "Bring It 2 Tha Table" (featuring Skatterman)
 2009 Tech N9ne- "B. Boy" (featuring Big Scoob, Bumpy Knuckles, Kutt Calhoun & Skatterman)
 2011: Big Scoob - "Twistin Yay" (featuring Krizz Kaliko, Skatterman & Rappin Twan)
 2011: Big Scoob - "DAMU" (featuring Skatterman''', Bumpy Knuckles, Jay Rock & Messy Marv)
2011: Bloodstepp - Putcha Hands Up (Featuring Skatterman) from the album The Chainsaw Underworld2012: Bloodstepp - Putcha Hands Up (Juggalo Gangsta Remix) (Featuring Skatterman) from the album Remixed And Chainsawed2013: Bloodstepp - Putcha Hands Up Again (Featuring Skatterman & Snug Brim) from the album Bass And Bubblegum''
2015: Windy City - Hawk Rising (featuring Skatterman - Prod. by Larry Elyea - Minds Eye Digital): Single from the forthcoming album "Cover Me"

References

External links
Official Website

1978 births
African-American male rappers
Living people
Rappers from Kansas City, Missouri
21st-century American rappers
21st-century American male musicians
21st-century African-American musicians
20th-century African-American people